Dahnejerd (also Romanized as Dahanjerd; also known as Danjerd) is a village in Sofalgaran Rural District, Lalejin District, Bahar County, Hamadan Province, Iran. At the 2006 census, its population was 1,019, in 246 families.

References 

Populated places in Bahar County